Mark Parisi (born 1961) is the creator of Off the Mark, a comic panel which began in 1987 and now appears in 100 newspapers, as well as on greeting cards, T-shirts, and more. Off the Mark is distributed daily by Universal Press Syndicate. Parisi's work is influenced by Charles Schulz, Gary Larson and MAD magazine. Parisi has also said he admires the work of cartoonists Jim Meddick, Sergio Aragonés, and Garry Trudeau.

In addition, Mark is the author and illustrator of the Marty Pants middle-grade novel series for HarperCollins.

Background 
Parisi began drawing when he was very young, and frequently copied comic strips out of newspapers. Parisi said that after reading Charles Schulz' comic strip Peanuts, he "immediately wanted to draw it." At Salem State University, he changed his major several times before settling on Art, with a concentration in Graphic Art.

Awards 
In 2008, 2011, and 2017 Parisi won the "Best Newspaper Panel" award for Off the Mark from the National Cartoonists Society. He also was nominated for the award in 2004, 2006, 2013, and 2016. In 2013, he also won the "Best Greeting Cards" award from the National Cartoonists Society.

References

^ Scott Nickel (August 9, 2009). "20 Questions with Mark Parisi".
2.Jump up ^ Steven Ellis (May 2, 2006). "On the mark with lots of laughs".
3.Jump up ^
https://joyce-bowen.blog/2017/03/31/on-the-mark/

External links
 Off the Mark
 http://www.gocomics.com/offthemark

1961 births
Living people
American cartoonists
Salem State University alumni